Perisyntrocha is a genus of moths of the family Crambidae.

Species
 Perisyntrocha alienalis
 Perisyntrocha anialis
 Perisyntrocha ossealis
 Perisyntrocha suffusa

Former species
 Perisyntrocha affinis
 Perisyntrocha circumdatalis
 Perisyntrocha cuneolalis
 Perisyntrocha flavalis
 Perisyntrocha picata

References

External links
http://globalspecies.org/ntaxa/2057009
http://www.enotes.com/topic/Perisyntrocha

Spilomelinae
Crambidae genera
Taxa named by Edward Meyrick